Trey Mitchell (born April 22, 1991) is an American soccer player.

Career

Youth and college 
Mitchell played four years of college soccer, two years at Citrus College, before moving to Cal State Dominguez Hills in 2012.

Mitchell also appeared for National Premier Soccer League side FC Hasental and Premier Development League side Ventura County Fusion.

Professional 
Mitchell signed with Major League Soccer side LA Galaxy on March 27, 2015. He was released by the Galaxy and became the league pool goalkeeper, spending time with Colorado Rapids, Sporting Kansas City, D.C. United and Orlando City SC.

On January 10, 2017, Mitchell signed with United Soccer League side Pittsburgh Riverhounds. On November 30, after just one season in Pittsburgh, Mitchell's contract option was declined by the club.

References

External links 
 

1991 births
Living people
American soccer players
Association football goalkeepers
Cal State Dominguez Hills Toros men's soccer players
Ventura County Fusion players
LA Galaxy players
Pittsburgh Riverhounds SC players
USL League Two players
USL Championship players
Soccer players from California
Orlando City SC players